Hypolyssus is a genus of fungi belonging to the Agaricomycetes class; it has not been assigned to an order or a family.  It consists of one species: Hypolyssus natalis. It was documented in 1825 by German mycologist Christiaan Hendrik Persoon.

References 

Agaricomycetes genera
Agaricomycetes
Monotypic Basidiomycota genera